Fielden Edward Faulkner II (born February 29, 1932 in Lexington, Kentucky) is an American film and television character actor.  He is most known for his roles in John Wayne films, including Hellfighters, The Green Berets, Rio Lobo, McLintock! and The Undefeated.  He also played small roles on other films and TV series including Dragnet and The Tim Conway Show. Before becoming an actor, Faulkner served in the United States Air Force for 2 years as a fighter pilot, eventually leaving the service ranked First Lieutenant.

Filmography

G.I. Blues (1960) - Red (uncredited)
The Little Shepherd of Kingdom Come (1961) - Capt. Richard Dean (uncredited)
The Horizontal Lieutenant (1962) - Officer at Welcome Party (uncredited)
McLintock! (1963) - Young Ben Sage
Kisses for My President (1964) - Secret Service Man (uncredited)
How to Murder Your Wife (1965) - Club Member in Steam Room / Party Guest
Shenandoah (1965) - Union Sergeant (uncredited)
Tickle Me (1965) - Brad Bentley
Sergeant Deadhead (1965) - Lt. Dixon
The Navy vs. the Night Monsters (1966) - Bob Spaulding
The Doomsday Flight (1966) - Reilly - Co-Pilot
The Ballad of Josie (1967) - Juror-Livery Man (uncredited)
Nobody's Perfect (1968) - John Abelard
The Green Berets (1968) - Capt. MacDaniel 
The Shakiest Gun in the West (1968) - Marshal Sam Huggins
Hellfighters (1968) - George Harris
Daddy's Gone A-Hunting (1969) - Cop at Dixon's Party (uncredited)
Hang Your Hat on the Wind (1969) - Pilot
The Undefeated (1969) - Capt. Anderson
Chisum (1970) - James J. Dolan
Swing Out, Sweet Land (1970, TV Movie) - Bit (uncredited)
Rio Lobo (1970) - Lt. Harris
Triangle (1970)
The Barefoot Executive (1971) - Reporter
Scandalous John (1971) - Hillary
Something Big (1971) - Capt. Tyler
Now You See Him, Now You Don't (1972) - Mike Bank Guard (uncredited)
The Man (1972) - Secret Service Man
Toke (1973)
Ride in a Pink Car (1974) - Frank Barber
The Florida Connection (1976) - Mule Tucker
 Hard Ground (2003) - Warden

Television

Have Gun - Will Travel - 13 episodes (1958-1962)
Rawhide - 7 episodes - Various  (1959-1964)
Gunsmoke -  6 episodes - Various  (1959-1972)
Bonanza - episode - The Friendship - Bob Stevens (1961)
Bonanza - episode - No Less a Man - Bank Robber in Green Shirt (1964)
Wagon Train - episode - The Silver Lady - Minister (1965)
The F.B.I. - episode - Anatomy of a Prison Break - Allen Wilson (1966) 
Bonanza - episode - Credit for a Kill -  Casey Rollins (1966)
Laredo - episode - The Other Cheek - Ed Garmes (1967)
Gilligan's Island - episode - It's a Bird, It's a Plane - Colonel - (1967)
The Invaders - episode - Storm - Alien #1 - (1967)
Mod Squad - episode - When Smitty Comes Marching Home - Griff (1968) 
Dragnet (1967 TV series) - episode - Public Affairs DR-12 - Agent Jim Shepheard (1968)
It Takes a Thief - episode - The Blue, Blue Danube - Wardlow (1969)
The Men From Shiloh, the rebranded name of The Virginian -episode With Love, Bullets and Valentines - Leroy Plimpton (1970)
O'Hara, U.S. Treasury - episode - Operation: Hijack - Sgt. Wall (1971)
O'Hara, U.S. Treasury - episode - Operation: Big Store - Ike Carter (1971)
Mod Squad - episode - Welcome to Our City - Frank Dunn (1971)
Bearcats! - episode - Assault on San Saba - Mills (1971)
Nichols - episode - Zachariah - Randall (1972) 
Cannon - episode - The Island Caper - Ferris (1972)
 Adam-12 - Sgt. Ed Powers (1972)
Movin' On - episode - The Cowhands -  Elton Edwards (1974)
The Blue Knight - episode - The Candy Man -  Reverend Bob (1976)
The Six Million Dollar Man - episode - Carnival of Spies -  episode - Russian Agent (1977)

External links

1932 births
Living people
Male actors from Kentucky
American male film actors
Actors from Lexington, Kentucky
20th-century American male actors
People from Palm Desert, California